Princess is a 2014 Israeli drama film directed and written by Tali Shalom Ezer. It is Ezer's first feature film. Shira Haas stars as Adar, a 12-year-old girl whose close relationship with her mother's boyfriend becomes sexually abusive. Princess premiered at the 2014 Jerusalem Film Festival.

Production
Films that inspired Ezer in the making of the film include Cría Cuervos and Persona.  Zohar-Hanetz had never acted prior to his role in the film, which he took after Tali Shalom-Ezer passed him in the street and insisted he take it. The film received funding from the Rabinovich Foundation in Israel.

Reception
“Artful cinematography and subtle and sensitive performances from the cast… help make the case for this emotionally complex drama as one of the best films of the festival,” said Salt Lake Magazine in a review of the film following its Sundance premiere.

Accolades
The film shared the Haggiag Award for Best Israeli Feature at the 2014 Jerusalem Film Festival. Haas won Best Israeli Actress at the festival for her role in the film.

Cast
Shira Haas as Adar
Keren Mor as Alma
Ori Pfeffer as Michael
Adar Zohar Hanetz as Alan

References

External links
 

2014 drama films
2014 films
Israeli drama films
Israeli independent films
2010s Hebrew-language films
Films about child abuse
Films about rape
2014 independent films